Khonkaen Star or full name Thai–Denmark Khonkaen Star is a female professional volleyball team based in Khonkaen, Thailand. The club was founded in 2005 and plays in the Thailand league.

Honours

Domestic competitions
Thailand League 
 Champion (2): 2007–08, 2012–13
 Runner-up (2): 2009–10, 2019–20
 Third (2): 2005–06, 2014–15
 Thai-Denmark Super League
 Champion (1): 2013
 Third (3): 2015, 2016, 2019
 
Kor Royal Cup
 Third (3): 2013, 2016, 2018

Youth League 

 Academy League
  Runner-up (1): 2019
  Third (1): 2018

International competitions
 Asian Club Championship 1 appearances 
 2013 — 7th place

Former names
Khon Kaen  (2005–2011)
SCG Khonkaen  (2011–2012)
Idea Khonkaen  (2012–2016)
Khonkaen Star  (2016–2018)
Thai–Denmark Khonkaen Star (2018–2019)
Khonkaen Star VC (2019–present)

Team colors 
Thailand League

    (2005–present)
    (2013–14)
    (2014–15)
     (2015–16)

Thai-Denmark Super League

     (2013)
    (2014)
    (2015)
    (2016)
   (2017–present)

Stadium and locations

Crest 
The club logo incorporates elements from their nickname; The Red Dino and their owner Toyota Kaennakorn.

League results

Team roster 2021–22

Team staff

Sponsors 

 Toyota Kaennakorn Co., LTD.
 Thai-Denmark
 Khon Kaen City Development (KKTT) Co., LTD.
 M-Society Fitness Khonkaen
 Ocel Sport
 North Eastern University

Position Main 

The following is the Khonkaen Star roster in the : Thailand League 2020-21

2020–21 Results and fixtures

Thailand League

First leg

Second leg

Imports

Head coach

Team Captains

Club player award

Notable players 

Domestic Players

 Sommai Niyompon
 Utaiwan Kaensing
 Onuma Sittirak
 Patcharee Deesamer 
 Saymai Paladsrichuay
 Nootsara Tomkom 
 Wanna Buakaew 
 Somruk Sungpokeaw
 Soraya Phomla
 Khwanjira Yuttagai 
 Kittiyakorn Phansamdaeng 
 Chidawan Anandamrongchai 
 Rujinan Muencharoen 
 Sontaya Keawbundit 
 Rapinnipa Kehatankunanon
 Chutikan Pholchai
 Woraluck Kraisorn
 Yupin Phalee
 Kullapa Piampongsan
 Chatsuda Nilapa
 Karina Krause
 Chitaporn Kamlangmak
 Aurairat Laolaem
 Tikamporn Changkeaw
 Natchanun Mora
 Boonyarat Homsomsub
 Rungruetai Sangsakorn
 Tapaphaipun Chaisri
 Kaewkalaya Kamulthala

Foreigner Players

 Ivana Luković

 Selime İlyasoğlu

 Đỗ Thị Minh 
 Nguyễn Thị Kim Liên

 Elisângela Paulino 
 Thaynara Emmel Roxo 
 Paula Ilisandra

References

External links
 Official website

Volleyball clubs in Thailand
Women's volleyball teams